John Winston Belcher (born 1943) is a professor of physics holding the "Class of '22" professorship at Massachusetts Institute of Technology. Professor Belcher's research interests are within the areas of space plasma physics. He was the principal investigator on the Voyager Plasma Science Experiment and is now a co-investigator on the Plasma Science Experiment on board the Voyager Interstellar Mission. Professor Belcher has twice received the NASA Exceptional Scientific Achievement Medal, and received the 2016 Oersted Medal for his exceptional work in revolutionizing the Undergraduate Physics department at MIT by introducing novel teaching formats such as TEAL. Belcher is actively involved in Mental Health initiatives at the institute and is an active MacVicar Faculty Fellow (2000–2006)

Background
Belcher was born in Louisiana in 1943 and graduated from Odessa High School in 1961. Belcher later graduated at Rice University with a double major in mathematics and physics. He later went to the California Institute of Technology and received a Ph.D. in astrophysics. Shortly after which Belcher came to MIT and began work with the Space Plasma Group on the Voyager project.

Work
Postdoctoral fellow, Interplanetary Plasma Group, 1971
Assistant Professor, MIT Physics, 1971–1975
Associate Professor, MIT Physics, 1975–1982
Professor, MIT Physics, 1982–Present
Class of '22 Professorship, 2004–Present
Associate Chair of the MIT Faculty, 2013–2014

Honors and Achievements
2016 Hans Christian Oersted Medal of the American Association of Physics Teachers
2008 APS Fellow
1990 NASA Exceptional Scientific Achievement Medal
1980 NASA Exceptional Scientific Achievement Medal

References

1943 births
Living people
21st-century American physicists
Rice University alumni
Massachusetts Institute of Technology School of Science faculty
California Institute of Technology alumni
Fellows of the American Physical Society